The following is a list of players who have captained the Port Adelaide Football Club at a game of Australian rules football in the Australian Football League (AFL) since 1997, the South Australian National Football League (SANFL) and earlier iterations of competition between 1870 and 1996, and the AFL Women's (AFLW) since 2022.

SANFL/AFL

AFL Women's

References

Port Adelaide
captains